Pine Grove is a census-designated place located in Ferry County, Washington, United States.

Demographics
In 2010, it had a population of 145. 68 of the inhabitants were male, and 77 were female.

Geography

It is in the valley of the Sanpoil River, a south-flowing tributary of the Columbia River.

References

Census-designated places in Ferry County, Washington